Conus (Atlanticonus) is a taxon of sea snails, marine gastropod mollusks in the family Conidae. Although formerly described as a distinct subgenus, it is currently considered as an alternative representation of the cone snail genus, Conus.

Species
All the species formerly classified in the subgenus Atlanticonus are now considered as "alternate representations" of species in the genus Conus:
 Conus (Atlanticonus) cuna (Petuch, 1998) represented as Conus cuna Petuch, 1998
  †Conus (Atlanticonus) franklinae Hendricks, 2015 represented as †Conus franklinae Hendricks, 2015
 Conus (Atlanticonus) glenni (Petuch, 1993) represented as Conus glenni Petuch, 1993
 Conus (Atlanticonus) granulatus (Linnaeus, 1758) represented as Conus granulatus Linnaeus, 1758
 †Conus (Atlanticonus) olssoni Maury, 1917represented as †Conus olssoni Maury, 1917
 Conus (Atlanticonus) ritae (Petuch, 1995) represented as Conus ritae Petuch, 1995

References

 Petuch E.J. & Sargent D.M. (2012) Rare and unusual shells of Southern Florida (Mainland, Florida Keys, Dry Tortugas). Mount Dora, Florida: Conch Republic Books. 189 pp.

Conidae
Gastropod subgenera